Banyutus lethalis is an African antlion. It is proposed as the mimic for the gregarious African antlion, Hagenomyia tristis, but can be identified based on the longer antennae and single dorsal stripe on the pterothorax. Both species fly gregariously through long grass and can be collected together. The larvae of B. lethalis are non-pit building, whereas those of H. tristis are pit-builders.

References

Myrmeleontidae
Insects of Africa